Susan Patterson Dalian (born September 15, 1968) is an American actress who is primarily known among anime fans as the voice of Haku in the first season of Naruto and the Screen Gems film The Brothers.

Early life and education 
Dalian was born in Baltimore. She graduated from the Baltimore School for the Arts and received a Bachelor of Fine Arts degree from Boston University.

Career 
Dalian received a nomination for Best Actress at the American Anime Awards in 2007. She voices Storm in Wolverine and the X-Men and Marvel vs. Capcom 3: Fate of Two Worlds. She also voices audio narration for novels. She has directed various theater productions and the short film Bite Me which was screened in 2019 at the Mammoth Lakes Film Festival and Festival Angaelica near Washougal, Washington.

Filmography

Film

Television

Video games

References

External links
 
 

1968 births
Living people
Actresses from Baltimore
African-American actresses
American video game actresses
American voice actresses
20th-century American actresses
21st-century American actresses
20th-century African-American women
20th-century African-American people
21st-century African-American women
21st-century African-American people